Sir Richard Westmacott  (15 July 17751 September 1856) was a British sculptor.

Life and career
Westmacott  studied  with  his father, also named  Richard Westmacott, at his studio in Mount Street, off Grosvenor Square in London before going to Rome in 1793 to study under Antonio Canova. Westmacott devoted all his energies to the study of classical sculpture, and throughout his life his real sympathies were with pagan rather than with Christian art. Within a year of his arrival in Rome he won the first prize for sculpture offered by the Florentine Academy of Arts, and in the following year he gained the papal gold medal awarded by the Academy of St Luke with his bas-relief of Joseph and his brothers. On returning to England in 1797, he set up a  studio, where John Edward Carew and Musgrave Watson gained experience.

Westmacott had his own foundry at Pimlico, in London, where he cast both his own works, and those of other sculptors, including  John Flaxman's statue of Sir John Moore for Glasgow. Late in life he was asked by the Office of Works for advice on the casting of the relief panels for Nelson’s Column. He also had an arrangement with the Trustees of the British Museum, which allowed him to make moulds and supply plaster casts of classical sculpture in the museum's collection to country house owners, academies and other institutions.

Westmacott exhibited at the Royal Academy between 1797 and 1839. His name is given in the catalogues as "R. Westmacott, Junr." until 1807, when the "Junr." was dropped. He was elected an associate of the Royal Academy in 1805, and a full academician in 1811. His academy diploma piece, a marble relief of Jupiter and Ganymede, remains in the Academy's collection. He was professor of sculpture at the Academy from 1827 until his death. He received his knighthood on 19 July 1837. In 1852 when contacted by the Corporation of London about a possible sculpture commission, Westmacott replied that he had not been active as a sculptor for some years.

Works
Among Westmacott's works are the reliefs for the north side of Marble Arch, the pedimental sculptures of figures representing The Progress of Civilisation on the British Museum, the Achilles of the Wellington Monument, London, and the Waterloo Vase now in Buckingham Palace Gardens. This enormous urn was sculpted from chunks of marble earmarked by Napoleon for a trophy commemorating his anticipated victory in the Napoleonic Wars and then given to George IV as a gift from the Grand Duke of Tuscany.

His statue of Horatio Nelson, Birmingham was the first statue of Nelson unveiled in Britain. There are other monuments to Nelson by Westmacott at the Bull Ring, Birmingham, in Barbados, while that at Liverpool was modelled and cast by Westmacott, to a design by Matthew Cotes Wyatt. In Liverpool there is also an equestrian statue of King George III sculpted by Westmacott, which was unveiled in 1822. He was responsible for the statue of the agriculturalist and developer Francis Russell, 5th Duke of Bedford in Russell Square, and the one of the Duke of York on top of the column in Waterloo place.  His Achilles in Hyde Park, a bronze copy of an antique sculpture from Monte Cavallo in Rome, is a tribute to the Duke of Wellington, paid for by £10,000 raised by female subscribers.

Westmacott's sculptures of poetical subjects  were in a style similar to those of the contemporary Italian school:  his works of this type included Psyche and Cupid for the Duke of Bedford; Euphrosyne for the Duke of Newcastle; A Nymph Unclasping her Zone;  The Distressed Mother and The Houseless Traveller.

Westmacott also sculpted the memorials to William Pitt the Younger, Spencer Perceval, Charles James Fox and Joseph Addison in Westminster Abbey; the statue of Fox in Bloomsbury Square; and those to Sir Ralph Abercromby, Lord Collingwood and Generals Pakenham and Gibbs in St Paul's Cathedral. Westmacott's memorial to Pitt in Westminster Abbey, commissioned in 1807, shows a male figure representing anarchy writhing in chains at Pitt's feet, a reference to Pitt's suppression of revolutionaries by press censorship and other means.

Westmacott's other church monuments include those to Lt. General Christopher Jeaffreson  (died 1824) in St.Mary's Church in Dullingham;  to Commander Charles Cotton (died 1828) at St. Mary's Church in Madingley; to William Pemberton (died 1828) at St Margaret's Church  in Newton, South Cambridgeshire; to Sir George Warren (died 1801) at St. Mary's Church, Stockport in Greater Manchester, depicting a standing female figure by an urn on a pillar; to  Rev. Charles Prescott  (died 1820), in St. Mary's Church, Stockport, showing a seated effigy and to Mary Henson (died 1805) in Bainton parish church, showing a seated figure against an urn. A bust of David Garrick by Westmacott is in Lichfield Cathedral.

He created a sculptural group for the marble arch of the Cumberland Gate to Hyde Park.

Personal life
Westmacott lived and died at 14 South Audley Street, Mayfair, London where he is commemorated by a blue plaque. Two of his brothers, George, who was active between 1799 and 1827, and Henry, (1784–1861) were also sculptors. In 1798 Westmacott married Dorothy Margaret Wilkinson. Their son, also called Richard Westmacott, followed closely in his footsteps also becoming a notable sculptor, a Royal Academician and professor of sculpture at the academy.

Westmacott is buried in a tomb at St Mary's Church, Chastleton in Oxfordshire, where his third son Horatio was rector in 1878.

Selected public works

1800-1809

1810-1819

1820-1829

1830-1839

1840 and later

Other works
 Life-sized marble relief monument to John Yorke, 1801, St Andrews Church, Wimpole, Cambridgeshire
 Memorial sculpture group, erected 1821, to Richard Pennant, 1st Baron Penrhyn, died 1808, Church of St Tegal, Llandygai, Wales
 Memorial to Rev. John Chetwynd Talbot, 1827, St Mary's Church, Ingestre, Staffordshire
 Memorial to Dr. John Wooll, c. 1833, Utah 
 Memorial plaque, with portrait medallion, to Francis Bauer, 1840, St. Anne's Church, Kew,

References

Sources

External links

 
 
 , a poem on the statuary group by Letitia Elizabeth Landon as part of her Poetical Sketches of Modern Pictures, in The Troubadour (1825).
  A poetical illustration by Letitia Elizabeth Landon, to an engraving of the statuary, in Friendship's Offering, 1826.

1775 births
1856 deaths
19th-century British sculptors
19th-century English male artists
British architectural sculptors
English male sculptors
Monumental masons
Neoclassical sculptors
Royal Academicians
Sculptors from London
Sibling artists